Hardy Bucks is an Irish comedy series, filmed in mockumentary style and following the fictional exploits of a group of twentysomething slackers living in small-town Ireland.

It started out as an online series of largely improvised scenes. A six-part webisode series went on to win the 2009 Storyland competition held by Irish national broadcaster RTÉ Television.

Production

Hardy Bucks was created in 2007 when Chris Tordoff (Viper Higgins) filmed Martin Maloney (Eddie Durkin) and Owen Colgan (Buzz McDonnell) for a college project. After sitting on the footage for a year, Tordoff uploaded the shorts to YouTube. The show's popularity eventually got it commissioned by RTE who took editorial control of the show.

Hardy Bucks was entered into the RTÉ Storyland competition and from a total of 122 applications, nine projects were commissioned to make one episode each. These episodes were released in March 2009. With all nine projects on the website, the public could vote for their favourite and at the end of every month the shows with the fewest votes would be voted off, leaving the remaining teams to make the next episode with the same €8,000 budget per episode. Hardy Bucks made it all the way to the finals (final two teams) and ultimately won the competition with the largest number of votes.

The programme has been compared to Trailer Park Boys, a Canadian mockumentary, with Tordoff citing the show as an influence. The show was filmed on location in Swinford, County Mayo.

In May 2010 director Mike Cockayne joined as a writer and producer. The Hardy Bucks have filmed a Christmas special and second series with director Liz Gill.

Irish Comedy series Created by Mike Cockayne was commissioned and broadcast by RTÉ from 12 October 2010 until 26 October 2010. Following the success of their debut television series, the Hardy Bucks were commissioned by RTÉ to produce a half-hour Christmas special which aired on 26 December 2010.

Starring Martin Maloney as Eddie Durkan, Chris Tordoff as 'The Viper'. It is written by and produced by Mike Cockayne, Hardy Bucks features Peter Cassidy, Owen Colgan and Tom Kilgallon, plus a cast of extras from Swinford and beyond. The series was directed by Liz Gill.

The three-episode television series, written by the writing trio Tordoff, Maloney and Cockayne, was commissioned and broadcast by RTÉ from 12 October 2010 until 26 October 2010.[3] Following the success of their debut television series, the Hardy Bucks were commissioned by RTÉ to produce a half-hour Christmas special which aired on 26 December 2010. The Hardy Bucks' second series, a six-episode run, was broadcast by RTÉ during 2011.

The Hardy Bucks Movie was released by Universal Pictures in Feb 2013, achieving Box Office No 1 on its opening weekend and becoming the most successful Irish film of 2013.

Hardy Bucks returned with a third series in November 2015, and again with a fourth series in March 2018.

Characters

Protagonists
Eddie Durkan (Martin Maloney) — the main character, an unemployed and lazy youth with vague ambitions of emigrating to find a better life.
Billy "Buzz" McDonnell (Owen Colgan) — Eddie's best friend, something of a philosopher who often argues with Eddie. Almost always wears a Celtic shirt and has a love of jambons and crows.
"Frenchtoast" O'Toole (Peter Cassidy) — known for his love of nature and fishing, and for making political statements.
Tommy "The Boo" Hagen (Tom Kilgallon) — a fitness lover with a mysterious past.

Antagonists
Francis "The Viper" Higgins (Chris Tordoff) — the main antagonist, a vain, arrogant but woefully inept small-time drug dealer whose wildly ambitious and poorly-planned schemes almost invariably land him in trouble.
Stateside (Tommy Miller) — one of the Viper's henchmen.
Dragon (Wayne Lynch) - The Viper's driver and henchman.
Viper 2 (Paul Butler Lennox) — an actor hired by the Viper to act as a decoy.
Jimmy 'The Hammer' Harrington (Andrew Williams) — Buzz's psychopathic, cross dressing, hammer-toting long lost cousin. Appears in Season 4, when he hides from the law in Eddie and Buzz's cottage.

Other characters

Salmon (Michael Salmon)
Seamie / Rama (Rhys Flinter)
Svetlana Salmon (Lisa McAllister) — Salmon's improbably attractive Russian girlfriend.
Big Mick (Eugene Maloney) — Eddie's uncle.
Seamus Mortimer (Michael Browne)
Ciara (Aoibheann McCaul) - Eddie's overbearing nymphomaniac girlfriend in series 3 and 4.
Sim Card (Kevin McGahern)
Patty (Susan Loughnane) - The Viper's girlfriend in series 3.
"Scorpio" Lyons (Alan Carter) - local DJ, head of the 'Almera Bois'
Noreen (Loretta Lee)- Eddie's girlfriend in series 1 and 2
Cowboy Lavin (Stephen Kelly)
Orla Flannery (Sheila Moylette)
Lexus (Paul Maloney)
Crowbar (Chris Kilcoyne) - leader of the Sligo Boys
Garda Koffi (Koffi Kuovi)  
Aloysius Lavin  (Micheál Mac Donnchadha)
Sligo Boy (James Durcan)
Ladybird (Kate Lawless)
Shady Ganly (Peter Ganly) - local man who was raised by crows

Episode list

Webisodes

Television

Season 1 (2010)

Season 2 (2011)

Season 3: Hardy Bucks Ride Again (2015)

Season 4 (2018)

Film 

On 28 November 2012, a trailer was released to promote The Hardy Bucks Movie, scheduled for cinematic release on 21 February 2013. The film follows the Hardy Bucks as they travel to Poland to support the Irish football team during the UEFA Euro 2012 football tournament. 
The film was partly funded by the Irish Film Board, which granted the project a €175,000 production loan and produced by Universal Studios. The film had a budget of €300,000 and was an Irish box office success. It grossed €176,887 on its opening weekend from 57 locations. To date, The Hardy Bucks Movie has taken over €500,000 at the Irish box office.

References

External links
Hardy Bucks Channel at YouTube

https://web.archive.org/web/20121019135034/http://www.bebo.com/hardybucks

Irish comedy television shows
Irish comedy troupes
RTÉ original programming
Comedy web series